Miss Silver's Past ("Lion Cub") is a 1969 novel by Czech author Josef Škvorecký.

Written between 1963 and 1967 (prior to the Prague Spring), it was published after it.

Plot
Karel Leden works at a publisher's in Communist Czechoslovakia. He meets Lenka Silver, a Jewish woman with a mysterious past.

Reception
Gleb Žekulin wrote that Lvíče "confirmed [Škvorecký] as the leading Czech prose writer of the post-Stalin era." Mavis Gallant also admired Miss Silver's Past.

Kirkus Reviews was scathing, saying "even the apparatchiks' wrangles over how and whether to publish a blockbuster novel are only mechanically amusing. And, in Czech fashion, the byplay of seduction is used to underline the camaraderie of the seducers while the women remain objects, and nothing human ever takes place. Škvorecký's style is trite and trivial."

Adaptation
The film was adapted for Czechoslovak television in 1969, under the title Flirt se slečnou Stříbrnou ("Flirting with Miss Stříbrná").

References

1969 novels
20th-century Czech novels
Novels set in Prague
Novels about communism
Novels set in Czechoslovakia
Censorship in the arts
Literature controversies